Caryocolum repentis is a moth of the family Gelechiidae. It is found in Spain, France, Germany, Austria, Switzerland, Italy, Slovenia and Russia (the southern Ural).

The larvae feed on Gypsophila repens. Young larvae mine the leaves of their host plant. The mine has the form of a blotch occupying the leaf from the base to the tip. The frass is ejected through the entrance opening. Older larvae live free between a number of young leaves that are held together by a spinning. Larvae can be found from May to late June. They have a yellowish green body and a black head.

References

Moths described in 1992
repentis
Moths of Europe